The 2021 Liga 3 East Java (also known as Liga 3 MS Glow For Men PSSI Jawa Timur for sponsorship reason) was the sixth season of Liga 3 East Java as a qualifying round for the national round of the 2021–22 Liga 3.

PSG Gresik (now AHHA PS Pati) were the defending champion.

Teams
There are 69 teams participated in the league this season.

Group stage

Group A

Group B

Group C

Group D

Group E

Group F

Group G

Group H

Group I

Group J

Group K

Group L

Group M

Group N

Knockout stage

References

Liga 3
Sport in East Java